Mr. Fix-It is a 1918 American silent comedy film starring Douglas Fairbanks, Marjorie Daw, and Wanda Hawley, directed by Allan Dwan.

Plot
As described in a film magazine, because of his ability to fix things Dick Remington (Fairbanks) becomes known as "Mr. Fix-It" and enters the aristocratic home of the Burroughs as their nephew. Before long he has melted the stone hearts of three aunts and one uncle and won the heart of Mary McCullough (Hawley) in addition to setting aright the affairs of pretty Georgiana Burroughs (MacDonald) and Olive Van Tassell (Landis).

Cast

Reception
Like many American films of the time, Mr. Fix-It was subject to restrictions and cuts by city and state film censorship boards. For example, the Chicago Board of Censors cut, in Reel 5, the policeman arresting women in kimono coming from raided house of ill repute.

Preservation status
On July 16, 2011 at the Castro Theatre in San Francisco, the San Francisco Silent Film Festival presented a restored print of the film from George Eastman House.

See also
 List of rediscovered films

References

External links
 
 
 
 
 Progressive Silent Film List: Mr. Fix-It at silentera.com
 Still at silentfilm.org

1918 films
American silent feature films
Paramount Pictures films
Silent American comedy films
1918 comedy films
Films directed by Allan Dwan
American black-and-white films
1910s rediscovered films
Rediscovered American films
1910s American films
1910s English-language films